Akuapem-Akropong is a town in the Eastern region of Ghana. The town is known for the Okuapeman Secondary School. The political system used in this town is the institution of Chieftaincy.  The school is a second cycle institution.
This town is also the capital of the Akuapem Traditional Area

References

HISTORY OF AKUAPEM STATE|url=http://www.okoman.com/Pages/THE%20HISTORY%20OF%20AKUAPEM%20STATE.html

Populated places in the Eastern Region (Ghana)